Johanna Konta and Laura Thorpe were the defending champions, but Thorpe chose not to participate, whilst Konta chose to participate in Madrid instead.

Andreea Mitu and Demi Schuurs won the title, defeating Xenia Knoll and Aleksandra Krunić in the final, 6–4, 7–5.

Seeds

Draw

References 
 Draw

Engie Open de Cagnes-sur-Mer Alpes-Maritimes - Doubles